The Bluenose Squash Classic was an annual squash tournament that took place in Halifax, Canada.

The event was part of the PSA World Tour. It was established in 2006, and was last held in 2015.

Past Results

See also
PSA World Tour

References

External links
- Official website
Squashsite.co.uk 2012 - website

Squash tournaments in Canada
Sport in Nova Scotia
Squash in Canada